The painted maskray (Neotrygon leylandi) or brown-reticulate stingray, is a species of stingray in the family Dasyatidae. It is found in Australia, Indonesia and Papua New Guinea. Its natural habitats are shallow seas, subtidal aquatic beds, and coral reefs.

References

Sources

painted maskray
Fish of Indonesia
Marine fish of Northern Australia
Taxonomy articles created by Polbot
painted maskray